Eric McManus (born 14 November 1950) is a Northern Irish retired footballer who played for Coleraine, Coventry City, Notts County, Stoke City, Lincoln City, Bradford City, Middlesbrough, Peterborough United, Tranmere Rovers and Boston United.

Career
McManus was born in Limavady and played for Coleraine before joining English club Coventry City in 1969. He failed to break into the first team at Highfield Road making just seven appearances in three seasons. He joined Notts County in the summer of 1972 and played in four matches in 1972–73 as the Magpies finished in 2nd place earning promotion to the Second Division. He became the regular number one at Meadow Lane making 265 appearances before joining Stoke City in the summer of 1979. At the Victoria Ground McManus was second choice behind Peter Fox and so spent the 1979–80 out on loan at Lincoln City and did not play at all in 1980–81. In 1981–82 McManus played in four matches when Fox was unavailable.

He joined Bradford City in August 1982 where he made 139 appearances in three seasons at Valley Parade. Whilst at Bradford, he won the Third Division title in 1984–85. On the last day of that successful season his day was to turn into a nightmare when 56 spectators were killed in a horrendous stand fire while playing Lincoln City. Out of favour in 1985–86, McManus spent time out on loan at Middlesbrough (making two appearances) and Peterborough United (making 18 appearances) before leaving permanently to join Tranmere Rovers. He was second choice to Billy O'Rourke in 1986–87 making five appearances and later went on to play for non-league Boston United. He was head of youth scouting at Walsall, until he left on 31 October 2008.

Career statistics
Source:

A.  The "Other" column constitutes appearances and goals in the Anglo-Scottish Cup, Football League Group Cup, Football League Trophy Inter-Cities Fairs Cup.

Honours
 Notts County
 Football League Third Division runner-up: 1972–73

 Bradford City
 1972–73 champions: 1984–85

References

External links
 

1950 births
Living people
Association footballers from Northern Ireland
English Football League players
Coleraine F.C. players
Coventry City F.C. players
Notts County F.C. players
Stoke City F.C. players
Lincoln City F.C. players
Bradford City A.F.C. players
Middlesbrough F.C. players
Peterborough United F.C. players
Tranmere Rovers F.C. players
Boston United F.C. players
Association football goalkeepers